Luciana Littizzetto (born 29 October 1964) is an Italian comedy actress, shock jock and humor writer.

Littizzetto is known in her home country for her irreverent gags, lampooning government ministers and church prelates alike.

Nicknamed "Lucianina" (Little Luciana in Italian), she is a prominent personality on Italian television, notably appearing weekly as guest on Rai 3's primetime show Che tempo che fa. Besides more trivial topics, she notably advocated a stricter policy in Italy dealing with sexual harassment.

Career 
Littizzetto grew up in the San Donato District in Turin where her family, originally from Bosconero, owned a milk and cheese shop.

Luciana graduated in 1984 at the Turin music school with a piano playing degree. She later obtained a Bachelor's degree from the University of Turin, at the Faculty of Humanities, and also attended an acting school in Moncalieri, close to Turin.

She briefly worked as a school teacher, but kept her stand-up comedy and acting skills in check by performing at local theatres in Turin and its province. Littizzetto subsequently worked as a voice actress, dubbing foreign soaps in Italian. Television appearances on The Maurizio Costanzo Show allowed her to eventually give up her teaching career and focus on her entertainer talents.

In 1993, she was part of the cast of Italian TV show Cielito Lindo, playing sketch character Sabrina. As such, she had her first catchphrase: "Minchia Sabbry!" (The Hell, Sabbry!). Subsequently, Littizzetto debuted on Radio Due's Hit Parade.

During the 1990s, she worked mainly for Mediaset, debuting on the cabaret show Zelig.

Since then, Littizzetto has created several famous characters and has entertained the Italian public with her fertile and varied television, film, theater and literary work. Up to 2014, Littizzetto authored 14 successful humor books. In some of them, she notoriously refers to male and female genitals as Walter and Iolanda, respectively.

In recent years, together with TV personality Fabio Fazio on his TV show Che tempo che fa, she has entertained Italian audiences on prime time with her humorous remarks about social trends. She has also shed a light onto cultural, social and political topics, notably calling for a bill in Italy to protect women against sexual harassment. These appearances have established her as a prominent TV personality of contemporary Italy. Littizzetto teamed up with Fazio several times. More recently, they voiced two characters for the Italian version of the movie Minions in 2015.

In 2007, Luciana Littizzetto was honored by the President of the Italian Republic, Giorgio Napolitano, with the prestigious De Sica Award, given for cultural and entertainment achievements. In both 2013 and 2014, Littizzetto was awarded Best Female on the Italian television.

In 2013, Littizzetto co-hosted the prestigious Sanremo Music Festival alongside long-time colleague Fabio Fazio, the show gaining high audience shares. Both hosts signed also for 2014, but that year the show proved to be unsuccessful, with an average audience share of 39%. Littizzetto was criticised for being paid €700,000 for co-hosting the Sanremo Festival.

Beginning in March 2015, Litizzetto is a member of Italia's Got Talent jury for its sixth series, broadcast in Italy by the pay-TV Sky Uno.

Personal life 
Littizzetto describes herself as an animal lover. She publicly supported gay rights in Italy. Together with boyfriend Davide Graziano, Littizzetto is a foster parent of two.

Filmography

Notes

External links 

Personal Site
RAI YouTube Clip

1964 births
Living people
Actors from Turin
Italian television personalities
Italian actresses
University of Turin alumni
Mass media people from Turin